The large-eared free-tailed bat (Otomops martiensseni) is a species of bat in the family Molossidae native to Africa. 

It is found in Angola, Central African Republic, Democratic Republic of the Congo, Ivory Coast, Djibouti, Ethiopia, Ghana, Kenya, Malawi, Rwanda, South Africa, Tanzania, Uganda, Yemen, Zambia, and Zimbabwe, and possibly Madagascar. Its natural habitats are subtropical or tropical dry forest, subtropical or tropical moist lowland forest, subtropical or tropical moist montane forest, dry savanna, arable land, and plantations.

References

Otomops
Bats of Africa
Fauna of Central Africa
Fauna of East Africa
Mammals of Southern Africa
Mammals of Angola
Mammals of the Central African Republic
Mammals of the Democratic Republic of the Congo
Mammals of Ethiopia
Mammals of West Africa
Mammals of South Africa
Mammals of Tanzania
Mammals of Uganda
Mammals of Zambia
Mammals of Zimbabwe
Taxonomy articles created by Polbot
Taxa named by Paul Matschie